Borys Oliynyk may refer to:

 Borys Oliynyk (poet) (1935–2017), Ukrainian poet
 Borys Oliynyk (Ukrzaliznytsia) (1934–1999), director of the Ukrainian Railways
 Borys Oliynyk (footballer) (1967-), Ukrainian footballer

See also
 Oliynyk